Billy Bremner (1942–1997) was a Scottish footballer, who played for Leeds United and Scotland in the 1960s and 1970s.

Billy Bremner may also refer to:

Billy Bremner (musician) (born 1946), Scottish guitarist
Billy Bremner (Australian footballer) (1872–1957), Australian rules footballer

See also
Bill Bremner (1879–1961), New Zealand lawn bowls player
William Bremner (cricketer) (1884–1961), South African cricketer